The 2006 Jacksonville Jaguars season was the franchise's 12th season in the National Football League and the 4th under head coach Jack Del Rio. The Jaguars failed to improve on their 12–4 record from 2005. The Jaguars finished in third place in the AFC South and finished the season at 8–8. Although the Jaguars were 8–5 after thirteen games, they lost their next three games in a row and missed the postseason for the second time in three seasons.

Offseason

Draft

Personnel

Staff

Roster

Schedule

Preseason

Regular season
{| class="wikitable" style="text-align:center"
|-
! style=""| Week
! style=""| Date
! style=""| Opponent
! style=""| Result
! style=""| Record
! style=""| Venue
! style=""| Attendance
|- style="background:#cfc;"
! 1
| September 10
| Dallas Cowboys 
| W 24–17
| 1–0
| Alltel Stadium
| 67,164
|- style="background:#cfc;"
!2
| 
| Pittsburgh Steelers
| W 9–0
| 2–0
| Alltel Stadium
| 67,164
|- style="background:#fcc;"
! 3
| September 24
| at Indianapolis Colts
| L 14–21
| 2–1
| RCA Dome
| 57,041
|- style="background:#fcc;"
! 4
| October 1
| at Washington Redskins
| L 30–36 
| 2–2
| FedEx Field
| 89,450
|- style="background:#cfc;"
! 5
| October 8
| New York Jets
| W 41–0
| 3–2
| Alltel Stadium
| 66,604
|-
! 6
|colspan="6"| Bye
|- style="background:#fcc;"
! 7
| October 22
| at Houston Texans| L 7–27
| 3–3
| Reliant Stadium
| 70,035
|- style="background:#cfc;"
! 8
| October 29
| at Philadelphia Eagles
| W 13–6
| 4–3
| Lincoln Financial Field
| 69,249
|- style="background:#cfc;"
! 9
| November 5
| Tennessee Titans| W 37–7
| 5–3
| Alltel Stadium
| 66,524
|- style="background:#fcc;"
! 10
| November 12
| Houston Texans| L 10–13
| 5–4
| Alltel Stadium
| 65,918
|- style="background:#cfc;"
! 11
| 
| New York Giants
| W 26–10
| 6–4
| Alltel Stadium
| 67,164
|- style="background:#fcc;"
! 12
| November 26
| at Buffalo Bills
| L 24–27
| 6–5
| Ralph Wilson Stadium
| 63,608
|- style="background:#cfc;"
! 13
| December 3
| at Miami Dolphins
| W 24–10
| 7–5
| Dolphin Stadium
| 73,160
|- style="background:#cfc;"
! 14
| December 10
| Indianapolis Colts| W 44–17
| 8–5
| Alltel Stadium
| 67,164
|- style="background:#fcc;"
! 15
| December 17
| at Tennessee Titans| L 17–24
| 8–6
| LP Field
| 69,134
|- style="background:#fcc;"
! 16
| December 24
| New England Patriots
| L 21–24
| 8–7
| Alltel Stadium
| 67,164
|- style="background:#fcc;"
! 17
| December 31
| at Kansas City Chiefs
| L 30–35
| 8–8
| Arrowhead Stadium
| 77,500
|}Note: Intra-division opponents are in bold' text.

Standings

Regular season results

Week 1: vs. Dallas Cowboys

Week 2: vs. Pittsburgh Steelers

Week 3: at Indianapolis Coltsat the RCA Dome, Indianapolis, Indiana 

With the loss, the Jaguars fell to 2–1.

Week 4: at Washington Redskinsat FedExField, Landover, Maryland 

With the loss, the Jaguars fell to 2–2.

Week 5: vs. New York Jetsat Alltel Stadium, Jacksonville, Florida 

With the win, the Jaguars went into their bye week at 3–2.

Week 7: at Houston Texansat Reliant Stadium, Houston, Texas 

With the loss, the Jaguars fell to 3–3.

Week 8: at Philadelphia Eaglesat Lincoln Financial Field, Philadelphia 

With the win, the Jaguars improved to 4–3.

Week 9: vs. Tennessee Titansat Alltel Stadium, Jacksonville, Florida 

With the win, the Jaguars improved to 5–3.

Week 10: vs. Houston Texansat Alltel Stadium, Jacksonville, Florida 

With the loss, the Jaguars fell to 5–4.

Week 11: vs. New York Giantsat Alltel Stadium, Jacksonville, Florida 

With the win, the Jaguars improved to 6–4.

Week 12: at Buffalo Billsat Ralph Wilson Stadium, Buffalo, New York 

With the loss, the Jaguars fell to 6–5.

Week 13: at Miami Dolphinsat Dolphin Stadium, Miami Gardens, Florida 

With the win, the Jaguars improved to 7–5.

Week 14: vs. Indianapolis Coltsat Alltel Stadium, Jacksonville, FloridaDuring this game, the Jaguars combined for 375 rushing yards, the second-most in a single game since the AFL–NFL merger. Maurice Jones-Drew had a franchise-record 302 all-purpose yards; 166 rushing yards with two touchdowns, 15 receiving yards, and 121 return yards with a kickoff return touchdown. Fred Taylor had 131 rushing yards with one touchdown.

With the win, the Jaguars improved to 8–5.

Week 15: at Tennessee Titansat LP Field, Nashville, Tennessee 

With the loss, the Jaguars fell to 8–6.

Week 16: vs. New England Patriotsat Alltel Stadium, Jacksonville, Florida 

With the loss, the Jaguars fell to 8–7.

Week 17: at Kansas City Chiefsat Arrowhead Stadium, Kansas City, Missouri''

With the loss, the Jaguars ended their season 8–8.

References

Jacksonville Jaguars
Jacksonville Jaguars seasons
Jackson